Sarax is a genus of amblypygids of the family Charinidae.

Species
There are 17 species in this genus. 
 Sarax brachydactylus Simon, 1892 – Cambodia, Malaysia, Philippines
 Sarax buxtoni Gravely, 1915 – Malaysia, Singapore
 Sarax cavernicola Rahmadi, Harvey & Kojima, 2010 – Borneo
 Sarax cochinensis Gravely, 1915 – India
 Sarax curioi Giupponi & Miranda, 2012 – Philippines
 Sarax davidovi Fage, 1946  – Cambodia, Laos, Vietnam
 Sarax huberi Seiter, Wolff & Hörweg, 2015 – Philippines
 Sarax javensis Gravely, 1915 – Java
 Sarax mardua Rahmadi, Harvey & Kojima, 2010 – Borneo

 Sarax monodenticulatus Rahmadi & Kojima, 2010 – Waigeo Island
 Sarax newbritainensis Rahmadi & Kojima, 2010 – New Britain
 Sarax rimosus Simon, 1901 – Malaysia
 Sarax sangkulirangensis Rahmadi, Harvey & Kojima, 2010 – Borneo
 Sarax sarawakensis Thorell, 1888 – Andaman Islands, Indonesia (Borneo, Java, Kalimantan), Malaysia (Sarawak, Selangor), Papua New Guinea, Singapore, Solomon Islands
 Sarax singaporae Gravely, 1911 – Singapore
 Sarax timorensis de Miranda & Reboleira, 2019 - Timor Leste
 Sarax willeyi Simon, 1892 – Papua New Guinea
 Sarax yayukae Rahmadi, Harvey & Kojima, 2010 – Borneo

References 

Amblypygi
Arachnid genera